Caladenia gracilis, commonly known as musky caps or musky caladenia, is a plant in the orchid family Orchidaceae and is endemic to eastern and south-eastern Australia, including Tasmania. It is a ground orchid with a single leaf and up to six flowers which are dark-coloured on the back and white on the front, sometimes tinged with pink and with a strong musky or soapy odour. The species is also known as Caladenia moschata in Victoria.

Description
Caladenia gracilis is a terrestrial, perennial, deciduous, herb with an underground tuber and which grows singly or in small groups. The sepals and petals are white on the front, sometimes tinged with pink or bronze colours and their backs have greenish-brown or purplish glandular hairs. The sepals and petals spread horizontally or slightly downwards. The sides of the labellum are slightly wavy near its base and have teeth nearer the tip which is strongly curled under and pink. There are four rows of calli along the centre of the labellum. The column has broad, rounded wings and reddish blotches.

Taxonomy and naming
Caladenia gracilis was first formally in 1810 by Robert Brown and the description was published in Prodromus Florae Novae Hollandiae. The specific epithet (gracilis) is a Latin word meaning "slender" or "thin". In Victoria, this orchid is known as Caladenia moschata.

Distribution and habitat
Musky caps occurs in New South Wales, Victoria, Tasmania and South Australia where it grows in open forest, on dry ridges and slopes. In New South Wales it is found south from the New England region, it is widespread in Victoria and Tasmania, and in South Australia it occurs in the south east corner near Millicent, Glencoe and Wrattonbully.

References

gracilis
Endemic orchids of Australia
Orchids of New South Wales
Orchids of Victoria (Australia)
Orchids of Tasmania
Orchids of South Australia
Plants described in 1810
Taxa named by Robert Brown (botanist, born 1773)